Bojana Novakovic is a Serbian-Australian actress. She is best known for her role as Det. Lizzie Needham on the drama television series Instinct (2017–2018).

Novakovic's film roles include Drag Me to Hell (2009), Edge of Darkness (2010), Devil (2010), Generation Um... (2012), The Little Death (2014), I, Tonya (2017), and Birds of Prey (2020).

Early life
Novakovic was born in Belgrade, SR Serbia, SFR Yugoslavia, to Serbian parents. Her younger sister, Valentina Novakovic, is also an actress. She moved to Australia in 1988, at the age of seven, and was initially interested in becoming a social worker or doctor, but she changed her mind and decided to pursue performing arts. Novakovic studied at The McDonald College in Sydney (where she was dux of 1999) and graduated from the National Institute of Dramatic Art with a bachelor's degree in dramatic arts in 2002.

Career
In 2003, Novakovic played Randa in the ABC mini-series Marking Time, a role which won her an AFI Award for "Best Actress in a Leading Role in a Television Drama or Comedy". As an actress, Novakovic's film credits in Australia include Blackrock (1996), Strange Fits of Passion (1998), The Monkey's Mask (1999), Thunderstruck (2004), Solo (2005) and the Serbian films The Optimists (2005) and Skinning (2010).
From 2007 to 2009, she played Tippi in TV series Satisfaction for Showtime Australia. She also appeared in Drag Me to Hell (2009), Edge of Darkness (2009), Devil (2010), Burning Man (2011), and Generation Um... (2012).

Her theatre credits in Australia include These People, Away and Strange Fruit at the Sydney Theatre Company; The Female of the Species at the Melbourne Theatre Company; Woyzeck (Helpmann award nomination for best supporting actress in 2009), Criminology (Green Room award nomination for best actress 2007), Eldorado (Helpmann nomination for best supporting actress, 2006) and Necessary Targets at the Malthouse Theatre in Melbourne, Death Variations and Loveplay (Ride On) for B Sharp, Romeo and Juliet with Bell Shakespeare company and Debris for Ride on Theatre (which received a Green Room nomination for best Independent production and best actress in 2006).

Novakovic runs her own independent theatre company, Ride On Theatre (Sydney and Melbourne) with co-director Tanya Goldberg. She was a producer and performer for the 2004 Ride on Theatre sell out season of LOVEPLAY at the Downstairs Belvoir Street Theatre, and the 2006 Green Room nominated production of Debris (in which she was also nominated for best actress).

In 2008, she translated, adapted and directed Fake Porno in Melbourne, which was invited to be part of the Powerhouse season in Brisbane in 2009, and also received three Green Room nominations including best production. Outside of Ride On, she wrote and directed with Melbourne's Black Lung Theatre for the critically acclaimed production of Sugar at the 2007 Adelaide Fringe festival. In 2010, Novakovic received an AFI nomination for International Award for Best Actress for her role in Edge of Darkness. She is currently starring in an improvised theatrical production called The Blind Date project for the Sydney Festival.

From 2013 to 2014, Novakovic starred on the comedy-drama television series Rake, which was cancelled after one season. In 2015, she portrayed Clare Hitchens in The Hallow, a horror film set in Ireland and directed by Corin Hardy. She had a recurring role on the fifth season of Shameless.

Filmography

Film

Television

Awards and nominations

References

External links
 

20th-century Australian actresses
21st-century Australian actresses
AACTA Award winners
Actresses from Belgrade
Australian film actresses
Australian people of Serbian descent
Australian stage actresses
Australian television actresses
Living people
National Institute of Dramatic Art alumni
Serbian emigrants to Australia
Year of birth missing (living people)